KBLD (91.7 FM) is a radio station broadcasting a Contemporary Christian format.  Licensed to Kennewick, Washington, United States, the station serves the Tri-Cities area.  The station is currently owned by Calvary Chapel Tri-Cities

History
The station was assigned the call sign KAIS on 1994-09-30.  On 1994-11-14, the station changed its call sign to the current KBLD.

In January 2009, CSN International reached an agreement to sell this station to.  The deal was approved by the FCC on March 13, 2009, and  ownership transferred to Calvary Chapel of Tri-Cities

References

External links

BLD
Radio stations established in 1994
1994 establishments in Washington (state)